Thomas Frederick Humphreys (8 September 1890 – 9 April 1967) was a British athlete who competed mainly in the cross country running team. He was born in Wingrave, Buckinghamshire and died in Aston Abbotts. He was affiliated with Herne Hill Harriers.

He competed for Great Britain in the 1912 Summer Olympics held in Stockholm, Sweden in the Cross Country Team where he won the bronze medal with his team mates Frederick Hibbins and Ernest Glover.

References

1890 births
1967 deaths
English male long-distance runners
People from Aylesbury Vale
Olympic bronze medallists for Great Britain
Athletes (track and field) at the 1912 Summer Olympics
Olympic athletes of Great Britain
Medalists at the 1912 Summer Olympics
Olympic bronze medalists in athletics (track and field)
Olympic cross country runners